Name of Russia was a series produced by the Russia-1 television channel that aimed to determine the most notable figure in Russian history through polling promoted via the Internet, Radio, and Television. Various professors, artists, and politicians would present information on the historical figure they were 'promoting', and people could then vote online for their chosen figure.  

From the outset, the project received heavy criticism for many reasons. The information pages on the project website that linked to every personality (named dossier pages by project creators) were inaccurately named and filled with trivial and inconsistent details. Internet news agency Lenta.ru highlighted this and explained how ridiculous some of the mistakes were. Since brigading was allowed and no precautions against botting were taken, the voting was wildly inaccurate, with some candidates rising from the bottom of the list to the top in a matter of hours. On 14 August, new voting rules were introduced that included the use of challenge–response authentication in the form of a multiple-choice question. According to the project's management, this new measure was aimed to curb the 'war of machines' or computer-generated voting.

Candidates and results 
The twelve candidates for greatest Russian were:

See also 
 Greatest Britons spin-offs

References

External links 
 Official site of 'Name of Russia' project 
 Running results
 'Names of Russia' alternative project
 Running results
 'Unnamed Russia' project
 Greatest Russian? Czar Nicholas leads vote

Greatest Nationals
Russia-1 original programming
Lists of Russian people
Russian television shows
2000s Russian television series
2008 Russian television series debuts
2008 Russian television series endings
Russian television series based on British television series